

Historical or architectural interest bridges

Major bridges 
This table presents the structures with spans greater than 100 meters (non-exhaustive list).

Notes and references 
 Notes

 Nicolas Janberg, Structurae.com, International Database for Civil and Structural Engineering

 Others references

See also 

 Transport in Algeria
 List of railway lines in Algeria
 Geography of Algeria
 List of rivers of Algeria
 List of Roman bridges
 List of aqueducts in the Roman Empire

External links

Further reading 
 

Algeria
 
Bridges
Bridges